Stomatella haliotiformis is a species of sea snail, a marine gastropod mollusk in the family Trochidae, the top snails.

Description

Distribution
This marine species occurs off Japan.

References

 Higo, S., Callomon, P. & Goto, Y. (2001) Catalogue and Bibliography of the Marine Shell-Bearing Mollusca of Japan. Gastropoda Bivalvia Polyplacophora Scaphopoda Type Figures. Elle Scientific Publications, Yao, Japan, 208 pp.

haliotiformis
Gastropods described in 1961